20 Centres for 2010 is an official campaign by FIFA coinciding with the 2010 World Cup in South Africa.  Twenty centres will be built in twenty different cities across Africa. Education and public health will be the social services offered to youths, along with a soccer field children can use.

External links

2010 FIFA World Cup